Eddie Boland (December 27, 1885 – February 3, 1935) was an American film actor. He appeared in more than 110 films between 1912 and 1937, mostly in comedic supporting roles. Among his best-known roles were "The Obliging Gentleman" in F. W. Murnaus silent film Sunrise: A Song of Two Humans (1927) and a criminal showman in the Harold Lloyd comedy The Kid Brother (1927). He was born in San Francisco, California and died in Santa Monica, California from a heart attack.

Filmography

References

External links

1885 births
1935 deaths
American male film actors
American male silent film actors
20th-century American male actors